{{DISPLAYTITLE:C18H14O9}}
The molecular formula C18H14O9 (molar mass: 374.29 g/mol, exact mass: 374.063782 u) may refer to:

 Fucophlorethol A, a phlorotannin
 Trifucol, a phlorotannin

Molecular formulas